The Oswego River  is a river in upstate New York in the United States. It is the second-largest river (after the Niagara River) flowing into Lake Ontario. James Fenimore Cooper’s novel  The Pathfinder, or The Inland Sea is set in the Oswego River valley.

The name Oswego is a Mohawk name that means "flowing out", or specifically, "small water flowing into that which is large".

Description
James Fenimore Cooper described the Oswego in these words:
The Oswego is formed by the junction of the Oneida and the Onondaga, both of which flow from lakes; and it pursues its way, through a gently undulating country, some eight or ten miles, until it reaches the margin of a sort of natural terrace, down which it tumbles some ten or fifteen feet, to another level, across which it glides with the silent, stealthy progress of deep water, until it throws its tribute into the broad receptacle of the Ontario.

River course
The Oswego River starts at the confluence of the Oneida River (flowing from Oneida Lake) and the Seneca River (flowing from Seneca Lake, Cayuga Lake, and Montezuma Marsh).

At its mouth at Lake Ontario, the river divides the City of Oswego, just as it divides the City of Fulton 11 miles upstream.

Oswego Canal
Part of its length the Oswego Canal was built. The Oswego River also serves as a part of the New York State Canal System, providing a route from the Erie Canal to Lake Ontario. This section of the canal was completed in 1827, two years after completion of the Erie Canal. In 1917, as part of a general overhaul of the canal system, the Oswego Canal was deepened and refurbished.

Pollution
The Oswego River was listed as a Great Lakes Areas of Concern in The Great Lakes Water Quality Agreement between the United States and Canada until it was formally removed on July 21, 2006.

Sportfishing
The river is known for its steelhead run in the early spring, followed by a salmon run in early autumn. The river is stocked annually by the New York State Department of Environmental Conservation with 140,000 Chinook salmon and 20,000 steelhead.

See also
List of New York rivers

Notes

References

External links
 Information and Boater's Guide to the Oswego River and NYS Canal
 New York State Barge Canal information
 Where to Fish, Oswego County
 Poem that references the river by name twice.

Rivers of New York (state)
Tributaries of Lake Ontario
Rivers of Onondaga County, New York
Rivers of Oswego County, New York